Apostolos Martinis (born 8 January 2001) is a Greek professional footballer who plays as a left-back for Super League 2 club Panathinaikos B.

Career

Aris
On 2 October 2020, Aris officially announced the signing of the young defender on a four-year deal.

Career statistics

References

2001 births
Living people
Greece youth international footballers
Super League Greece players
Super League Greece 2 players
Olympiacos F.C. players
Aris Thessaloniki F.C. players
Association football fullbacks
Footballers from Athens
Greek footballers
Panathinaikos F.C. B players